"One Day" is a single by Iranian–Swedish singer Arash featuring Swedish singer Helena. The song was released on 7 April 2014.

Track listing

Charts

Weekly charts

Year-end charts

References

2014 songs
Arash (singer) songs
Songs written by Robert Uhlmann (composer)
Songs written by Arash (singer)